Aspall may refer to:

 Aspall, Suffolk, a village and civil parish in the Mid Suffolk district of Suffolk, England
 Aspall Cyder, produced in Suffolk, England